ANZAC Girls is an Australian television drama series that first screened on ABC1 on 10 August 2014. The six-part series tells the rarely told true stories of the nurses serving with the Australian Army Nursing Service at Alexandria, Lemnos, and the Western Front during the First World War.  The series is based on Peter Rees' book The Other ANZACs as well as diaries, letters, photographs  and historical documents.
The series was written by Felicity Packard and Niki Aken, produced by Screentime, and filmed in South Australia.

Cast
Cast members include:
 Anna McGahan as Sister Olive Haynes
 Caroline Craig as Matron Grace Wilson
 Georgia Flood as Sister Alice Ross-King
 Laura Brent as Sister Elsie Cook 
 Antonia Prebble as Sister Hilda Steele
 Todd Lasance as Major Sydney "Syd" Cook 
 Dustin Clare as Lieutenant Harry Moffitt
 Brandon McClelland as Lieutenant Norval 'Pat' Dooley
 John Waters as Colonel Thomas Fiaschi
 Charles Mayer as Major Xavier Leopold
 Thomas Cocquerel as Lieutenant Frank Smith
 Honey Debelle as Sister Kit McNaughton
 Rhondda Findleton as Matron Ellen "Nellie" Gould
 Sara West  as Clarice Daley
 Leon Ford  as Major John Prior
 Hannah Marshall as Sister Millicent Parker
 Charlotte Hazzard as Sister Florence Tilly
 Maddy Jevic as Sister Meg Hayes
 Nathaniel Dean as Major Lionel Quick
 Brad Williams as Major Archibald Springer
 Nicholas Bell as General William Birdwood
 Josef Ber as Major Sherwin

Episodes

Ratings

Awards and nominations

See also
Anzacs (TV series)
The War That Changed Us, 4-episode ABC documentary first shown 19 August 2014
Margaret Graham (matron)

References

External links
 

English-language television shows
Australian Broadcasting Corporation original programming
2014 Australian television series debuts
Australian drama television series
World War I television drama series
ANZAC (Australia)
Television series by Screentime